Tom Apke (born July 16, 1943) was a college basketball coach at Creighton, Colorado, and Appalachian State. From 1974 to 1981, he coached at Creighton, where he compiled a 130–64 record. From 1981 to 1986, he coached at Colorado, where he compiled a 59–81 record. From 1986 to 1996, he served as the head basketball coach at Appalachian State. During his ten-year tenure, he compiled a 139–147 record.

Basketball head coaching record

References

1943 births
Living people
Appalachian State Mountaineers men's basketball coaches
College men's basketball head coaches in the United States
Colorado Buffaloes men's basketball coaches
Creighton Bluejays athletic directors
Creighton Bluejays men's basketball coaches
Creighton Bluejays men's basketball players